How Could It Be is the debut musical studio album by comedian/actor Eddie Murphy. The album was released on July 20, 1985, on Columbia Records and was produced by Aquil Fudge, with the exception of the hit top ten single "Party All the Time", which was produced by Rick James.

The album was a commercial success, making it to No. 26 on the Billboard 200 and No. 17 on the Top R&B/Hip-Hop Albums. Two singles were released: "Party All the Time", which made it to No. 2 on the Billboard Hot 100 and the title track, which became a minor R&B hit. This studio album was recorded as part of fulfilling a $100,000 bet that Richard Pryor had made with Eddie Murphy that he could not sing. In the album's liner notes, Eddie Murphy wrote the following "To Richard Pryor, my idol, with whom I have a $100,000 bet. No, motherfucker, I didn't forget."

Background 
For this album, Murphy enlisted other well-known musicians to help him create his first musical studio album. The record has two Stevie Wonder produced and written tracks, “Do I” and “Everything’s Coming Up Roses.” There are also two songs that Rick James produced and wrote—the title track (a minor R&B hit) and the successful hit, "Party All the Time”.

Murphy wrote three tracks on the album in which he also gets sole writing credit for: “Con Confused”, a disco track, “I, Me, Us, We”, a Parliament homage, and “My God Is Color Blind”, an anti-racism song. Murphy took an experimental approach to test himself in what he could do with music.

Track listing

Personnel 
James Allen, Dennis Davis, Rick James – drums, Oberheim DMX (track 5)
Aquil Fudge – percussion
Frank Hamilton, Michael McKinney, Fred Washington – bass
Gordon Banks, Ben Bridges, Kenny Hawkins, Larry John McNally, Mike O'Neil, Paul Pesco, Greg Poree, David Williams, Larry Menally – guitar
Frank Hamilton, Greg Levias, Jeff Lorber, Greg Phillinganes, Darryl Ross, Levi Ruffin, Bill Wolfer, Stevie Wonder, Bill Young – keyboards, synthesizers, Roland Juno-60 bass (track 5)
Abdoulaye Soumare, Bob Bradlove – synthesizer programming
Stevie Wonder – harmonica
Steve Porcaro – synths on "Party All the time"
Larry Fast – synth
Earl Gardner, Richard Gibbs, Larry Gittens, Bob Malach, Keith Quinn – horns
Roderick Bascom, Crystal Blake, Alvin "Blues" Broussard, Anthony Clark, Carlotta Clark, Lisa Clark, Paul Freudenburg, Larry Gittens, Rod Gordon, Cynthia Green, Bruce Hawes, Rick James, David Allen Jones, Jacque Kimbrough, Derek Lawrence, Lorelei McBroom, Daryl Murphy, LaMorris Payne, Darryl Phinnessee, William Rivera, Dwayne Roberson, Darryl Ross, Levi Ruffin, Howard Smith, Spartacus R., Michelle Wiley, Philip "Bully" Williams, Steven Lindstrom – backing vocals
Technical 
Larkin Arnold – executive producer
Nancy Greenberg – art direction
Annie Leibovitz – photography

Charts

Certifications

References 

Eddie Murphy albums
1985 debut albums
Columbia Records albums
Albums produced by Rick James
Albums produced by Stevie Wonder